The discography of Japanese singer Mai Kuraki consists of fifteen studio albums, six compilation albums, twenty-three video albums, three remix albums, fifty-six singles, and sixteen promotional singles. Kuraki debuted in 1999, while she was still in high school, through Giza Studio. The label initially marketed Kuraki in the United States under the name Mai K, and released the single "Baby I Like" (1999). However, the single was a commercial failure which prompted the label to send her back to Japan. There, they released her single "Love, Day After Tomorrow", which peaked at number two on the Oricon Singles Chart and was certified million by the Recording Industry Association of Japan (RIAJ). The second single, "Stay by My Side" became her first number one single on the chart. Kuraki's debut album, Delicious Way, topped the Oricon Albums Chart and was certified triple million by the RIAJ.

In 2001, her second album Perfect Crime was released, and it became another million seller, certified quadruple-platinum by the RIAJ. "Winter Bells", released in 2002 became her second number one single on the Oricon Singles Chart, and its parent album, Fairy Tale, topped the Albums Chart. It sold over 700,000 copies in Japan and earned a triple-platinum certification from the RIAJ. The albums If I Believe (2003), Wish You the Best (2004), Fuse of Love (2005), and Diamond Wave (2005) all charted within the top three of the Albums Chart. Both If I Believe and Wish You the Best peaked at number one on the Albums Chart. The former sold over 400,000 copies and was certified two-times platinum by the RIAJ while the latter sold more than 950,000 copies and was certified million by the RIAJ. Kuraki's next studio album release, One Life (2008) charted outside the top 10, peaking at number 14 on the Albums Chart. However, the follow-up to One Life titled Touch Me! (2009) peaked at number one, earning a gold certification. Her second compilation album All My Best (2009) sold over 250,000 copies in Japan and was certificated platinum. The follow-up albums Future Kiss (2010) and Over the Rainbow (2012) peaked at number 3 and 2, respectively, on the Oricon Albums Chart. Her third compilation album Mai Kuraki Best 151A: Love & Hope (2014) sold over 67,000 copies and was certificated gold. Her 11th album Smile (2017) sold only 29,000 copies in Japan and failed commercially but its follow-up single "Togetsukyo (Kimi Omou)" become her best-selling song in 2010's, and the best selling song by a solo female singer in 2017.

She has also collaborated with Tak Matsumoto of B'z on the single "Imitation Gold", which peaked at number one on the Oricon Singles Chart. In 2009, she was featured on the single "Sunao ni Ienakute" by Zard, a rearranged version of the band's 1991 song of the same title. The single peaked at number five on the Oricon Singles Chart.

Albums

Studio albums

Compilation albums

Video albums

Remix albums

Singles

As lead artist

As a featured artist

Promotional singles

Other charted songs

Other appearances

Songwriting credits

Notes

References 

Discographies of Japanese artists
Pop music discographies
Rhythm and blues discographies